Fairfield railway station may refer to:

 Fairfield railway station (England), in Tameside, Greater Manchester
 Fairfield railway station, Brisbane, on the Beenleigh line in Queensland, Australia
 Fairfield railway station, Melbourne (formerly Fairfield Park), on the Hurstbridge line in Victoria, Australia
 Fairfield railway station, Sydney, on the Main South line in New South Wales, Australia
 Fairfield station (Metro-North), on the Northeast Corridor in Connecticut, USA

See also 
 Fairfield (disambiguation)